A list of films produced in France in 2004.

External links
 2004 in France
 2004 in French television
 French films of 2004 at the Internet Movie Database
French films of 2004 at Cinema-francais.fr

2004
Films
French